Htay Myint (born 5 July 1953) is a Burmese racewalker. He competed in the men's 20 kilometres walk at the 1996 Summer Olympics.

References

External links
 

1953 births
Living people
Athletes (track and field) at the 1996 Summer Olympics
Burmese male racewalkers
Olympic athletes of Myanmar
Place of birth missing (living people)
Athletes (track and field) at the 1994 Asian Games
Asian Games competitors for Myanmar